Sudden Death Syndrome is the second album by the Jordanian dark Oriental metal band Bilocate. It was released independently on January 7, 2008.

Track listing 
All songs written by BILOCATE.

Personnel
Bilocate
 Ramzi Essayed – vocals
 Rami Haikal – guitar
 Waseem Essayed – Keyboard instrument
 Hani Al Abadi – bass guitar
 Baha' Farah – guitar
 Ahmad Klob – drums

Production
 Co-produced, mixed, and engineered by Jens Bogren
 Mastered at Fascination Street studios, Örebro, Sweden, by Jens Bogren
 Drums by Ahmed Klob & Waseem EsSayed, recorded by Ahmed Kloub, and digitized by Waseem EsSayed; engineered by Jens Bogran
 Guitars and Arabic Oud recorded by Rami Haikal and Baha' Farah
 Bass recorded at The Phexagon studio; sound technician Mohannad Bursheh, Amman, Jordan
 Vocals recorded at In The Mix studios; sound engineer Nash Planojevic, Dubai, UAE
 Keyboards, percussion, and pianos recorded and engineered by Waseem EsSayed

References

2008 albums
Bilocate albums
Albums produced by Jens Bogren